{{DISPLAYTITLE:1 32 polytope}}

In 7-dimensional geometry, 132 is a uniform polytope, constructed from the E7 group.

Its Coxeter symbol is 132, describing its bifurcating Coxeter-Dynkin diagram, with a single ring on the end of one of the 1-node sequences.

The rectified 132 is constructed by points at the mid-edges of the 132.

These polytopes are part of a family of 127 (27-1) convex uniform polytopes in 7-dimensions, made of uniform polytope facets and vertex figures, defined by all permutations of rings in this Coxeter-Dynkin diagram: .

1_32 polytope

This polytope can tessellate 7-dimensional space, with symbol 133, and Coxeter-Dynkin diagram, . It is the Voronoi cell of the dual E7* lattice.

Alternate names
 Emanuel Lodewijk Elte named it V576 (for its 576 vertices) in his 1912 listing of semiregular polytopes.
 Coxeter called it 132 for its bifurcating Coxeter-Dynkin diagram, with a single ring on the end of the 1-node branch.
 Pentacontihexa-hecatonicosihexa-exon (Acronym lin) - 56-126 facetted polyexon (Jonathan Bowers)

Images

Construction

It is created by a Wythoff construction upon a set of 7 hyperplane mirrors in 7-dimensional space.

The facet information can be extracted from its Coxeter-Dynkin diagram, 

Removing the node on the end of the 2-length branch leaves the 6-demicube, 131, 

Removing the node on the end of the 3-length branch leaves the 122, 

The vertex figure is determined by removing the ringed node and ringing the neighboring node. This makes the birectified 6-simplex, 032, 

Seen in a configuration matrix, the element counts can be derived by mirror removal and ratios of Coxeter group orders.

Related polytopes and honeycombs
The 132 is third in a dimensional series of uniform polytopes and honeycombs, expressed by Coxeter as 13k series. The next figure is the Euclidean honeycomb 133 and the final is a noncompact hyperbolic honeycomb, 134.

Rectified 1_32 polytope

The rectified 132 (also called 0321) is a rectification of the 132 polytope, creating new vertices on the center of edge of the 132. Its vertex figure is a duoprism prism, the product of a regular tetrahedra and triangle, doubled into a prism: {3,3}×{3}×{}.

Alternate names
 Rectified pentacontihexa-hecatonicosihexa-exon for rectified 56-126 facetted polyexon (acronym rolin) (Jonathan Bowers)

Construction

It is created by a Wythoff construction upon a set of 7 hyperplane mirrors in 7-dimensional space. These mirrors are represented by its Coxeter-Dynkin diagram, and the ring represents the position of the active mirror(s).

Removing the node on the end of the 3-length branch leaves the rectified 122 polytope, 

Removing the node on the end of the 2-length branch leaves the demihexeract, 131, 

Removing the node on the end of the 1-length branch leaves the birectified 6-simplex, 

The vertex figure is determined by removing the ringed node and ringing the neighboring node. This makes the tetrahedron-triangle duoprism prism, {3,3}×{3}×{}, 

Seen in a configuration matrix, the element counts can be derived by mirror removal and ratios of Coxeter group orders.

Images

See also
 List of E7 polytopes

Notes

References
 
 H. S. M. Coxeter, Regular Polytopes, 3rd Edition, Dover New York, 1973
 Kaleidoscopes: Selected Writings of H.S.M. Coxeter, edited by F. Arthur Sherk, Peter McMullen, Anthony C. Thompson, Asia Ivic Weiss, Wiley-Interscience Publication, 1995,  
 (Paper 24) H.S.M. Coxeter, Regular and Semi-Regular Polytopes III, [Math. Zeit. 200 (1988) 3-45]
  o3o3o3x *c3o3o3o - lin, o3o3x3o *c3o3o3o - rolin

7-polytopes